Bellanagare or Ballinagare, is a village in County Roscommon, Ireland. The N5 national primary road passes through it , though a by-pass is planned. The village is located between Tulsk and Frenchpark on the Dublin to Castlebar/Westport road.

History

O'Conor Don 
The O'Conor Don ancestral lands were in County Roscommon centred on Clonalis House near Castlerea in County Roscommon. When Alexander O'Conor Don died in 1820 without a male heir, the title was inherited by the O'Conors of Bellanagare. In 1828, O'Conor Don of Belanagar was a member of the Grand Panel of county Roscommon. At the time of Griffith's Valuation, Charles Owen O'Conor was one of the principal lessors in the parishes of Kilcorkey and Kilkeevin, barony of Castlereagh.

Charles O'Connor 
Charles O'Conor, of Belanagare, was a scholar and antiquary who was born in 1710. In 1754 he published a work on Irish mining, and in 1766 he published the work for which he is best known, Dissertations on the History of Ireland. O'Conor died at Belanagare on 1 July 1791, and his collection of manuscripts (containing the only then known original of the first part of the Annals of the Four Masters), passed into the hands of the Marquis of Buckingham. These were later purchased as part of the Stowe manuscript collection by Bertram Ashburnham, 4th Earl of Ashburnham.

Bellanagare Castle and Hermitage House 

Bellanagare Castle was the home of the O'Conor family, including the historian Charles O'Conor. He later built Hermitage House some distance away, and Bellanagare Castle fell into ruin.

Hermitage House was built by Charles O'Conor circa 1760. It was a smaller Georgian house which he called his "Hermitage". At Hermitage House, he devoted the remainder of his life to the collection and study of Irish manuscripts, to the publication of dissertations, and to the cause of Irish and Catholic emancipation. He was a co-founder of the first Catholic Committee in 1757, (along with his friend Dr. John Curry and Mr. Wyse of Waterford). In 1788 he became a member of the Royal Irish Academy. His great great grandson Charles O'Conor was leasing the property at Ballaghcullia, valued at £10, to Honoria O'Conor at the time of Griffith's Valuation. In 1749 the Census of Elphin records Denis O'Conor as being of "Ballinagar". The house at Hermitage is still extant though not occupied and a modern bungalow has been constructed in front of it.

Sport and community

Ballinagare Community Centre 

Ballinagare Community Centre community-run centre for the village and surrounding area. It runs leisure activities, spinning classes, box exercise classes, walkers and joggers group, pilates, step aerobics, and has a gym, and astro turf pitch.

Ballinagare FC 

Ballinagare Football Club was established in August 2004. The club colours are orange with a black trim, and the club play home games at Ballinagare Community Pitch. An Astro Turf Pitch was opened in 2012 and situated beside the community centre.

Western Gaels GAA Club 

The Western Gaels Club was formed in Fairymount Hall in 1962. The club area consists of the parishes of Frenchpark and Fairymount in West Roscommon, close to the towns of Castlerea and Ballaghaderreen. Prior to that there were clubs in both parishes but due to emigration both of these clubs were very weak. Probably the most famous son of the area is Dr. Douglas Hyde of Tibohone, who was Patron of the GAA from 1902 to 1915, and the first President of Ireland from 1938 to 1945. Another member of the GAA, Pádraig Ó Caoimh, Ard-Rúnaí 1939-1964 was born in the village of Ballinagare. During the 1970s the club won five juvenile titles. The first major title at adult level was the Junior County Championship in 1977.

Other associations 
Ballinagare Horse and Pony Racing club was established in 2012. The first annual race meeting and family day was held on 16 September 2012 in memory of the late Peter Finnerty. Ballinagare's cycling club also held its first charity cycle during 2012 in aid of Cancer Care west.

See also
 List of towns and villages in Ireland

References

External links
 Historic map showing Hermitage House and estate near Bellanagare
 Hermitage 1812 Bog Commission Survey - Photo

Towns and villages in County Roscommon